Werning is a surname. Notable people with the surname include:

Iván Werning (born 1974), Argentine economist
Paula Werning, Finnish politician

See also
Wenning